A large regiment is a multi-battalion infantry formation of the British Army. First formed in the 1960s, large regiments are the result of the amalgamation of a number of existing single-battalion regiments, and perpetuate the traditions of each of the predecessor units.

Origins
Up to 1948, line infantry regiments in the British Army had two battalions, in the form that had been implemented under the 1881 Childers Reforms, which was intended to allow each regiment to have one battalion stationed in the UK, and the other stationed overseas. However, Indian independence in 1947 saw plans put in place to reduce all of the British Army's line infantry and rifles regiments to a single battalion. Although some regiments temporarily raised new battalions during the early 1950s, following the Defence Review announced in 1957, the majority of regular infantry of the British Army consisted of single-battalion regiments grouped in administrative "brigades", consisting of anywhere from two to seven battalions.

Although the battalions in a brigade (with the exception of the Guards and Gurkha brigades) shared a common depot and cap badge, they maintained a separate regimental identity. Reductions in troop numbers following the 1957 review had necessitated the amalgamation of pairs of regiments within the brigades from 1958 to 1961, a process that sometimes proved controversial.

Genesis of the large regiment
The idea of the "large regiment" originated in 1962. Speaking in the House of Commons on 8 March, the Minister of War, John Profumo, stated that there was not going to be a further extensive reorganisation of army units. However, talking of the need to increase flexibility in the services, he noted that the regimental system of the infantry could be said to "stand in the way of change". He stated that the transition from the regimental to the brigade system "had on the whole been going well" and it was now time to see if there were "tangible advantages from the point of view of recruiting and flexibility" to be gained from a "large regiment system".

On 16 March The Times reported that the War Office were in the early stages of planning for the creation of large regiments. The plan involved the conversion of the existing brigades into regiments, with each of the regiments forming a numbered battalion of the large regiment. The creation of the multi-battalion regiments would allow the infantry to be expanded or reduced as needed. This could be done by the increase or decrease in the number of battalions of each regiment, rather than by the emotive process of merging or disbanding historic single-battalion regiments. The report noted that this process had effectively already begun in the East Anglian and Green Jackets Brigades, where regiments had been redesignated or amalgamated as the 1st, 2nd and 3rd East Anglian Regiments and 1st, 2nd and 3rd Green Jackets.

The first large regiments

In 1963, the first preparations for the introduction of large regiments began with the disbanding of the Forester Brigade. The Royal Lincolnshire Regiment had transferred to the East Anglian Brigade and amalgamated with the Northamptonshire Regiment in 1958. Five years later, the three remaining battalions were also moved, with the Royal Warwickshire Regiment moving to the Fusilier Brigade (and being renamed as the Royal Warwickshire Fusiliers); the Royal Leicestershire Regiment to the East Anglian Brigade; and the Sherwood Foresters to the Mercian Brigade.

In February 1964, approval for the creation of the first large regiment was given, with the Royal Anglian Regiment to be formed from the four regular battalions of the East Anglian Brigade. The new regiment was formed on 1 September. In May 1965 it was announced that the regiments of the Green Jackets Brigade were to become the three-battalion Royal Green Jackets from 1 January 1966.

In September 1965, figures showed that the new large regiments were recruiting more successfully than the remaining single-battalion regiments, some of which were only at rifle company strength. In particular the Welsh, North Irish and Lancastrian Brigades were under strength. It was thought that the Yorkshire Brigade and Home Counties Brigade were likely to form large regiments in the near future, while plans to merge the battalions of the Highland Brigade were only being delayed by failure to agree on a common tartan to be worn. While the Army Board could not compel regiments to amalgamate, it was their stated "wish and intention" that they should. The survival of the weaker brigades was under doubt, while a feasibility study into the formation of a single "Corps of Infantry" was initiated.

In June 1966, it was announced that the regiments of the Home Counties Brigade had agreed to form the third large regiment. Accordingly, on 31 December, the four regiments became the Queen's Regiment. By July 1967, three more Brigades had opted to become large regiments. All three mergers occurred in 1968: the Fusilier Brigade became the Royal Regiment of Fusiliers on 23 April, the North Irish Brigade became the Royal Irish Rangers on 1 July and the Light Infantry Brigade became The Light Infantry on 10 July.

The Defence White Paper of 1967 reduced the number of infantry battalions, with the large regiments all losing one battalion in 1968. The six brigades that had chosen not to form large regiments were also to lose a battalion: the decision to amalgamate a pair of regiments or to disband the junior regiment being left to the council of colonels of the brigade.

The Royal Anglian Regiment - formed 1 September 1964 from:
1st East Anglian Regiment (Royal Norfolk and Suffolk) - 1st Battalion
2nd East Anglian Regiment (Duchess of Gloucester's Own Royal Lincolnshire and Northamptonshire) - 2nd Battalion
3rd East Anglian Regiment (16th/44th Foot) - 3rd Battalion
The Royal Leicestershire Regiment - 4th Battalion
The Royal Green Jackets - formed 1 January 1966 from:
1st Green Jackets (43rd and 52nd) - 1st Battalion
2nd Green Jackets, The King's Royal Rifle Corps - 2nd Battalion
3rd Green Jackets, The Rifle Brigade - 3rd Battalion
The Queen's Regiment - formed 31 December 1966 from:
The Queen's Royal Surrey Regiment - 1st Battalion
The Queen's Own Buffs, The Royal Kent Regiment - 2nd Battalion
The Royal Sussex Regiment - 3rd Battalion
The Middlesex Regiment (Duke of Cambridge's Own) - 4th Battalion
The Royal Regiment of Fusiliers - formed 23 April 1968 from:
The Royal Northumberland Fusiliers - 1st Battalion
The Royal Warwickshire Fusiliers - 2nd Battalion
The Royal Fusiliers (City of London Regiment) - 3rd Battalion
The Lancashire Fusiliers - 4th Battalion
The Royal Irish Rangers (27th (Inniskilling), 83rd and 87th) - formed 1 July 1968 from:
The Royal Inniskilling Fusiliers - 1st Battalion
The Royal Ulster Rifles - 2nd Battalion
The Royal Irish Fusiliers (Princess Victoria's) - 3rd Battalion
The Light Infantry - formed 10 July 1968 from:
The Somerset and Cornwall Light Infantry - 1st Battalion
The King's Own Yorkshire Light Infantry - 2nd Battalion
The King's Shropshire Light Infantry - 3rd Battalion
The Durham Light Infantry - 4th Battalion

On 1 July 1968, the brigade system was abandoned, with the infantry being grouped in six administrative "divisions" instead. Individual regimental cap badges were reintroduced and the creation of large regiments effectively ceased. Following a change of government in 1970, a policy of retaining single-battalion regiments was implemented.

The majority of the new large regiments formed between 1964 and 1968 were grouped together into two of the new administrative divisions - the Queen's Regiment, Royal Regiment of Fusiliers and Royal Anglian Regiment together formed the Queen's Division, while the Light Infantry and Royal Green Jackets made up the new Light Division. The Royal Irish Rangers was allocated, along with the single battalion regiments from the North of England, to the King's Division. The remaining three were the Guards Division (the five regiments of foot guards), the Scottish Division (the remaining Scottish line infantry regiments), and the Prince of Wales' Division (regiments from Wales and the West of England).

Ulster Defence Regiment
In 1970, an additional large regiment was formed following the establishment of the Ulster Defence Regiment. This was created in order to remove duties more suited to the military from the police force in Northern Ireland, which, at the time, had seen increasing violence occurring (regarded as the beginning of the period known as "The Troubles"). The Ulster Defence Regiment was established on 1 January 1970, with the intention of forming a number of local battalions, each established within a county or other local area within the province. On 1 April 1970, the first seven battalions became part of the British Army's order of battle. Upon its establishment, the Ulster Defence Regiment was the biggest infantry regiment in the British Army. Two years after it was formed, a further four battalions were added, taking the total to eleven.
The Ulster Defence Regiment - formed 1 January 1970
1st (County Antrim) Battalion
2nd (County Armagh) Battalion
3rd (County Down) Battalion
4th (County Fermanagh) Battalion
5th (County Londonderry) Battalion
6th (County Tyrone) Battalion
7th (City of Belfast) Battalion
8th (County Tyrone) Battalion
9th (County Antrim) Battalion
10th (City of Belfast) Battalion
11th (Craigavon) Battalion

Options for Change
 
Under the Options for Change defence cuts announced in 1990, the number of infantry battalions was to be reduced. While some of the reductions were effected by the merger of pairs of single-battalion regiments, two existing large regiments were further amalgamated, and the four single battalion infantry regiments of the Brigade of Gurkhas  became a large regiment.
The Royal Irish Regiment (27th (Inniskilling), 83rd, 87th and Ulster Defence Regiment) - formed 1 July 1992 from:
The Royal Irish Rangers (27th (Inniskilling), 83rd and 87th)
The Ulster Defence Regiment
The Princess of Wales's Royal Regiment (Queen's and Royal Hampshires) - formed 9 September 1992 from: 
The Queen's Regiment
The Royal Hampshire Regiment
The Royal Gurkha Rifles - formed 1 July 1994 from:
2nd King Edward VII's Own Gurkha Rifles (The Sirmoor Rifles)
6th Queen Elizabeth's Own Gurkha Rifles
7th Duke of Edinburgh's Own Gurkha Rifles
10th Princess Mary's Own Gurkha Rifles

In addition to the battalions of the Royal Irish Regiment and the Royal Gurkha Rifles, seven more multi-battalion regiments also lost a battalion.

Future Infantry Structure

In 2004, the Army Board announced the ending of the "Arms Plot" system, where individual battalions changed role and moved station every 2 to 6 years. The Board argued that the existing system led to seven or eight battalions being unavailable at any time due to retraining while changing roles. The lack of stability for the families of soldiers due to constant moving of locations was also cited as a disadvantage. In the future, battalions would retain the same role and largely the same location. As part of this process, all infantry would be organised as large single cap badge regiments of two or more battalions; this would continue to allow soldiers the ability to undertake different roles through transferring between battalions of their regiment. At the same time, there was to be a reduction in the number of battalions, with amalgamations to take place within the administrative divisions created in 1968: The Scottish Division was to lose one battalion, the King's Division two and the Prince of Wales's Division one. Each division was to consider one of two options:

The "small/large" option of two (three in the case of the Queen's Division) regiments, each of two or three battalions.
The "large/large" option of one regiment of four or more battalions.

The results of the reorganisation, which were completed in September 2007, were:

The Scottish Division formed a single "large/large" regiment of five battalions, The Royal Regiment of Scotland, on 28 March 2006 from:
The Royal Scots (The Royal Regiment)
The Royal Highland Fusiliers (Princess Margaret's Own Glasgow and Ayrshire Regiment) - 2nd Battalion
The King's Own Scottish Borderers
The Black Watch (Royal Highland Regiment) - 3rd Battalion
The Highlanders (Seaforth, Gordons and Camerons) - 4th Battalion
The Argyll & Sutherland Highlanders (Princess Louise's) - 5th Battalion

The Queen's Division adopted the "small/large" option, retaining the three existing regiments with two regular battalions each:
The Princess of Wales's Royal Regiment (Queen's and Royal Hampshires)
The Royal Regiment of Fusiliers
The Royal Anglian Regiment

The King's Division also adopted the "small/large" option:
The Duke of Lancaster's Regiment (King's, Lancashire and Border) was formed on 1 July 2006 (initially of three battalions, reduced to two in March 2007) from:
The King's Own Royal Border Regiment - 3rd Battalion
The King's Regiment - 2nd Battalion
The Queen's Lancashire Regiment - 1st Battalion
The Yorkshire Regiment (14th/15th, 19th and 33rd/76th Foot) was formed on 6 June 2006 from:
The Prince of Wales's Own Regiment of Yorkshire - 1st Battalion
The Green Howards (Alexandra, Princess of Wales's Own Yorkshire Regiment) - 2nd Battalion
The Duke of Wellington's Regiment (West Riding) - 3rd Battalion

The Prince of Wales' Division formed two "small/large" regiments:
The Royal Welsh was formed on 1 March 2006 from:
The Royal Welch Fusiliers - 1st Battalion
The Royal Regiment of Wales (24th/41st Foot) - 2nd Battalion
The Mercian Regiment formed with 3 regular battalions on 1 September 2007 from:
The 22nd (Cheshire) Regiment - 1st Battalion
The Worcestershire and Sherwood Foresters Regiment (29th/45th Foot) - 2nd Battalion
The Staffordshire Regiment (The Prince of Wales's) - 3rd Battalion
In addition the Devonshire and Dorset Regiment  and Royal Gloucestershire, Berkshire and Wiltshire Regiment were transferred to the Light Division in 2005 and renamed as light infantry.

The Light Division was initially going to follow the "small/large" route, with the Royal Green Jackets retaining two battalions, and The Light Infantry gaining a third by amalgamating with the Devonshire and Dorset Regiment and the Royal Gloucestershire, Berkshire and Wiltshire Regiment. However, the four regiments then took the decision to form a single five-battalion "large/large" regiment, The Rifles on 1 February 2007:
The Devonshire and Dorset Light Infantry
The Light Infantry
The Royal Gloucestershire, Berkshire and Wiltshire Light Infantry
The Royal Green Jackets

Additionally, The Royal Irish Regiment (27th (Inniskilling), 83rd, 87th and Ulster Defence Regiment), as a result of the end of the Provisional IRA's armed campaign in 2005, saw its three Home Service battalions disbanded in July 2007, leaving just the single regular general service battalion. The Parachute Regiment, although ostensibly unaffected by the reforms, saw its 1st Battalion removed from the infantry order of battle and transferred to the control of the United Kingdom Special Forces to form the core element of the tri-service Special Forces Support Group.

Each regiment within the new structure also gained at least one Territorial Army (TA) battalion through amalgamating with its local multi-cap badge TA regiment. The two large/large regiments gained two TA battalions.

The Guards Division and the Royal Gurkha Rifles were left unreformed.

Army 2020
As part of the 2010 Strategic Defence and Security Review, the British Army would be restructured and reduced in size, including the reduction of the infantry by a total of two battalions. One of the results of this was that two of the existing large regiments were reduced to a single battalion each, while the other "small/large" regiments were all reduced to two battalions, with each retaining their existing reserve battalions.

The Royal Regiment of Scotland was reduced from five battalions to four, with the reduction of the 5th Battalion to a single company.
The Yorkshire Regiment (14th/15th, 19th and 33rd/76th Foot) had its 2nd Battalion disbanded, reducing it to two battalions
The Mercian Regiment had its 3rd Battalion disbanded, reducing it to two battalions
The Royal Regiment of Fusiliers was reduced to a single battalion
The Royal Welsh was reduced to a single battalion

Two regiments, the Princess of Wales's Royal Regiment and the Rifles, each received an additional reserve battalion. The Royal Gurkha Rifles, as part of an overall expansion of the Brigade of Gurkhas, was to raise a third battalion

Future Soldier

In March 2021, the government published a new defence review, entitled Defence in a Competitive Age, that was undertaken as part of the larger Integrated Review into the UK's foreign, defence and security policies. This would entail a reorganisation of the infantry's divisional administrative structure, as part of which, another of the large regiments originally formed under Future Infantry Structure in 2007, the Mercian Regiment, was reduced to a single regular battalion. Further changes were announced relating to the so-called "specialised infantry" battalions formed under the 2015 SDSR, with their operational formation, the Specialised Infantry Group, to be regimented as a new large regiment, dubbed the "Ranger Regiment", initially intended to be formed in August 2021 as part of a new "Special Operations Brigade": On 25 November 2021, the new plan for the restructuring of the Army, which was entitled Future Soldier, was announced. The most significant announcement was the formation of the planned new regiment, The Rangers, from four of the five battalions of the Specialised Infantry Group:
The Rangers - formed 1 December 2021 from:
The Royal Scots Borderers, 1st Battalion The Royal Regiment of Scotland - 1st Battalion
2nd Battalion, The Princess of Wales's Royal Regiment (Queen's and Royal Hampshires) - 2nd Battalion
2nd Battalion, The Duke of Lancaster's Regiment (King's, Lancashire and Border) - 3rd Battalion
4th Battalion, The Rifles - 4th Battalion

The reformation of the fifth battalion in the Specialised Infantry Group, 3rd Battalion, the Royal Gurkha Rifles, was cancelled, leaving the regiment with two battalions. Instead, individual company sized units were formed intended to operate across the army, including attached to The Rangers.

Following the original announcement in March that the Mercian Regiment would be reduced to a single regular battalion, the formation of The Rangers, a brand new regiment with its own cap badge, saw a further two large regiments, the Princess of Wales's Royal Regiment and the Duke of Lancaster's Regiment, also reduced in size to a single regular battalion, while the Royal Regiment of Scotland was reduced to three regular battalions and The Rifles to four. In addition, although the Foot Guards battalion assigned to the "Security Force Assistance" role was reduced in size, its excess manpower was used to generate two additional public duties companies. The first battalion to be so formed was 1st Battalion, Irish Guards, which generated No 9 Company and No 12 Company for public duties. These two companies will be used to represent the 2nd Battalion, Irish Guards, which was originally placed in suspended animation in 1947.

Notes

References

Infantry regiments of the British Army
Regiments of the United Kingdom
Royal Regiment of Fusiliers